Fredrick Lessner (1825–1910) was a German tailor active in the nineteenth century Communist movement. He was a member of the Communist League and participated in the 1848 Revolution. In 1852 he was a defendant in the Cologne Communist Trial.

References

1825 births
1910 deaths
19th-century German people
20th-century German people
German activists